Eric Gales (born October 29, 1974), also known as Raw Dawg, is an American blues rock guitarist, originally hailed as a child prodigy. , Gales has recorded nineteen albums for major record labels and has done session and tribute work. He has also contributed vocals on several records by the Memphis rap groups Prophet Posse and Three 6 Mafia under the name Lil E.

Career
Gales picked up the guitar at age four. His older siblings, Eugene and Manuel (Little Jimmy King), taught him songs and licks when he was young, in the style of Jimi Hendrix, Albert King, B.B. King and others. In 1985, the young Gales began to play at blues competitions with his brother Eugene backing him on bass. Although Gales plays a right-handed guitar "upside-down" (with the bass E string on the bottom), he is not naturally left-handed; he was taught by his brother, who is left-handed, and never second-guessed the untraditional technique.

In late 1990, Eric and Eugene Gales signed with Elektra Records, and together with the drummer Hubert Crawford released The Eric Gales Band (1991) and Picture of a Thousand Faces (1993). Guitar World magazine's Reader's Poll named Eric the "Best New Talent", in 1991. During this time he had two rock radio hits, "Sign of the Storm" (number 9, U.S. Mainstream Rock) and "Paralyzed" (number 31, U.S. Mainstream Rock) and had spots on television programs such as The Arsenio Hall Show.

In 1994, Gales performed with Carlos Santana at Woodstock '94. In 1995, Gales teamed up with both of his brothers to record an album, Left Hand Brand (released in 1996), as the Gales Brothers. In 2001 Gales released his album That's What I Am on MCA Records.

Gales has released the albums Crystal Vision, The Psychedelic Underground, The Story of My Life and Layin' Down the Blues on the Shrapnel Records label. Relentless (2010) was followed by Transformation (2011) and Live (2012).

In 2004, he contributed a cover of "May This Be Love" to the album Power of Soul: A Tribute to Jimi Hendrix. In 2008, he and other guitarists participated in the touring tribute to Jimi Hendrix, Experience Hendrix. The touring group of musicians included Billy Cox, Eric Johnson, Chris Layton, Doyle Bramhall II, Brad Whitford and Mitch Mitchell (it was the last tour that Mitchell played on).

In the winter of 2010, Gales returned to the touring circuit in Europe with TM Stevens on bass guitar and Keith LeBlanc on drums. The tour was billed as VooDoo Chile and featured works of Jimi Hendrix as well as original material from both Gales and Stevens.

In February 2013, Magna Carta Records released the album Pinnick Gales Pridgen, produced by Mike Varney and featuring Gales on guitar and vocals, Doug Pinnick on bass and vocals, and Thomas Pridgen on drums. The 13-track album featured one cover song, "Sunshine of Your Love", originally by Cream, one short instrumental based on Ludwig van Beethoven's "Für Elise", and the remaining songs written by some combination of Pinnick, Gales, Pridgen and Varney. The follow-up album, PGP2, was released in July 2014.

In 2017, Gales released his fifteenth studio effort, Middle of the Road, featuring numerous artists, including Gary Clark Jr., Lauryn Hill and others, as well as his own brother and mother. The album became his first to chart on Billboard'''s Top Blues Album chart, peaking at No. 4, while Gales' following album, The Bookends, topped the chart at No. 1. On May 9, 2019, he won the Blues Music Award for 'Blues Rock Artist of the Year'. In his acceptance speech, he said he was celebrating three years of sobriety. In May 2020, Gales won his second consecutive Blues Music Award as the 'Blues Rock Artist of the Year'.

On October 21, 2021, Gales released the single "I Want My Crown," featuring Joe Bonamassa. The song serves as the lead single from his upcoming album Crown. Produced by Bonamassa and Josh Smith, the album was released on January 28, 2022. The album highlights Gales' “struggles with substance abuse, his hopes about a new era of sobriety and unbridled creativity, and his personal reflections on racism.” Upon release, it debuted at No. 1 on the Billboard Blues Album chart, his second to do so. It also garnered Gales his first Grammy nomination for Best Contemporary Blues Album.

Discography

1991: The Eric Gales Band (Elektra Records)
1993: Picture of a Thousand Faces (Elektra Records)
1996: The Gales Brothers: Left Hand Brand (House of Blues Records)
2001: That's What I Am (MCA Records)
2006: Crystal Vision (Shrapnel Records)
2007: The Psychedelic Underground (Shrapnel Records)
2008: The Story of My Life (Blues Bureau International)
2009: Layin' Down the Blues (Blues Bureau International)
2010: Relentless (Blues Bureau International)
2011: Transformation (Blues Bureau International)
2012: Live 
2013: Pinnick Gales Pridgen, Pinnick Gales Pridgen (Magna Carta)
2013: Eric Gales Trio, Ghost Notes (Tone Center Records)
2014: Pinnick Gales Pridgen, PGP2 (Magna Carta)
2014: Good for Sumthin (Cleopatra Records)
2016: A Night on the Sunset Strip, two discs (Cleopatra Records)
2017: Middle of the Road (Provogue/Mascot)
2019: The Bookends (Provogue/Mascot)
2022: Crown (Provogue/Mascot)

Gales also performed on the following albums:
1994: L.A. Blues Authority: Cream of the Crop1994: Hard Love: 14 Original Metal Ballads1999: Project Pat: Ghetty Green, uncredited verse on the song "Up There", as Lil E (Hypnotize Minds)
1999: Whole Lotta Blues: Songs of Led Zeppelin1999: Parker Card & The Sideman Syndicate, Parker Card, with Shawn Lane (Orchard Records)
1999: This Ain't No Tribute Blues Cube1999: Blues Power: Songs of Eric Clapton1999: Blue Power: Song of Eric Clapton, This Ain't No Tribute1999: Triple 6 Mafia: Underground Vol. 2 (Club Memphis), with "Lil E – Half on a Sack or Blow" (Prophet Entertainment)
2000: Blue Haze: Songs of Jimi Hendrix2000: Hypnotize Camp Posse: Three 6 Mafia Presents...Hypnotize Camp Posse, uncredited verse on the song "We Bout to Ride", as Lil E (Hypnotize Minds)
2000: Triple 6 Mafia: Underground Vol. 3 (Kings of Memphis), with "Lil E – The Powder [The Higher Version]" and "Lil E – Niggaz Down 2 Make Some Endz" (Prophet Entertainment)
2001: Hellhound on My Trail: Songs of Robert Johnson2002: Led Zeppelin: This Ain't No Tribute Series – All Blues'd Up!2002: Eric Clapton: This Ain't No Tribute Series – All Blues2002: A Salute to the Delta Blues Masters2003: Presents, Vol. 12003: Highway 60's 70's Blues Revisited2003: Got Blues!2003: Wall of Soul: Lance Lopez
2004: Power of Soul: A Tribute to Jimi Hendrix2005: Show You a Good Time2005: Rock Revisited2005: Get Down Workout2005: Blues Interlude2005: Lottery: Diamonds-N-Da-Ruff2006: Wes Jeans – Forest of the Pine2006: Viva Carlos: Supernatural Marathon Celebration2006: A Walk on the Blues Side2006: Billy Cox and Buddy Miles, The Band of Gypsys Return2014: Eli Cook, Primitive Son''

References

External links
Eric Gales official website
Shrapnel Records official website

1974 births
Living people
Prophet Entertainment
African-American guitarists
African-American rock musicians
American blues guitarists
American male guitarists
American child musicians
American rock guitarists
People from Memphis, Tennessee
Singers from Tennessee
20th-century American guitarists
21st-century American guitarists
Guitarists from Tennessee
20th-century African-American male singers
21st-century African-American male singers
Provogue Records artists